Elliot Perlman (born 7 May 1964) is an Australian author and barrister. He has written four novels (Three Dollars, Seven Types of Ambiguity, The Street Sweeper and Maybe the Horse Will Talk), one short story collection (The Reasons I Won't Be Coming) and a book for children.

Life
Perlman is the son of second-generation Jewish Australians of East European descent. He studied law at Monash University in Melbourne, graduating in 1989. He was called to the Bar in 1997, but while working as a judge's associate in the early 1990s he started writing short stories. He lives in Melbourne.

Writing career
In 1994 he won The Age Short Story Award for "The Reasons I Won't Be Coming", a short story that later gave the title to his first collection of short stories, published in 1999. In 1998, his first novel, Three Dollars, was published. It won The Age Book of the Year and the Betty Trask Prize. His second novel, Seven Types of Ambiguity, was shortlisted for the Miles Franklin Award, Australia's most prestigious literary award, in 2004. Perlman's third novel, The Street Sweeper, was published in 2011. In an interview in 2001 he named Graham Greene as one of the writers who inspire him, describing Greene as "a master of beautifully crisp, clean and spare prose". He has been called a post-grunge lit writer, a reference to his works being written following the 1990s genre of grunge lit.

Themes and style
His work "condemns the economic rationalism that destroys the humanity of ordinary people when they are confronted with unemployment and poverty." This is not surprising in a writer who admires Raymond Carver and Graham Greene because they "write with quite a strong moral centre and a strong sense of compassion." However, he says, "Part of my task is to entertain readers. I don't want it to be propaganda at all. I don't think that for something to be political fiction it has to offer an alternative; I think just a social critique is enough." He describes himself, in fact, as being interested in "the essence of humanity" and argued that exploring this often means touching on political issues. Perlman often uses music, and song lyrics, in his work to convey an idea or mood, or to give a sense of who a character is. However, he recognises that this is "a bit of a risk because the less familiar the reader is with the song, the smaller the pay off."

Adaptations
His novel Three Dollars was produced as a film in 2005. It was directed by Robert Connolly, and starred David Wenham and Frances O'Connor. Perlman and Connolly jointly adapted the novel.

A six-part series based on Seven Types of Ambiguity was screened on ABC Television in 2017.

Awards and nominations
2019: Children's Peace Literature Award: shortlisted for The Adventures of Catvinkle
2012: Miles Franklin Award: longlisted for The Street Sweeper
2005: Australian Film Institute (AFI) Awards, Best Adapted Screenplay: winner for Three Dollars
2005: Film Critics Circle of Australia, Best Screenplay – Adapted: winner for Three Dollars
2005: AWGIE Awards, Film Award, Feature: shortlisted for Three Dollars
2004: Commonwealth Writers Prize, South East Asia and South Pacific Region, Best Book: shortlisted for Seven Types of Ambiguity
2004: Queensland Premier's Literary Awards, Best Fiction Book: shortlisted for Seven Types of Ambiguity
2004: Miles Franklin Award: shortlisted for Seven Types of Ambiguity
2000: Arts Queensland Steele Rudd Australian Short Story Award: joint winner for The Reasons I Won't Be Coming
1999: Betty Trask Award for Commonwealth Writers Under 35 Years: winner for Three Dollars
1999: Queensland Premier's Literary Awards, Best Literary Work Advancing Public Debate: joint winner for Three Dollars
1999: Miles Franklin Award: shortlisted for Three Dollars
1998: The Age Book of the Year Award, Book of the Year: winner for Three Dollars
1998: The Age Book of the Year Award, Fiction Prize: winner for Three Dollars
1994: The Age Short Story Award: winner for The Reasons I Won't Be Coming

Bibliography

Novels
 Three Dollars (1998)
 Seven Types of Ambiguity (2003)
 The Street Sweeper (2011)
 Maybe the Horse Will Talk (2019)

Short story collection
 The Reasons I Won't Be Coming (1999)

For children
 The Adventures of Catvinkle, illustrated by Laura Stitzel (2018)
 Catvinkle and the Missing Tulips, illustrated by Laura Stitzel (2020)

External links
 Portrait of the Artist as a Young Man at barristers.com.au
 Q & A with Elliot Perlman at the State Library of Victoria website
 2012 radio interview (one hour) at The Bat Segundo Show

References

1964 births
Living people
20th-century Australian novelists
Jewish Australian writers
Writers from Melbourne
Monash University alumni
21st-century Australian novelists
Australian male novelists
Australian male short story writers
20th-century Australian short story writers
Australian barristers
20th-century Australian lawyers
21st-century Australian lawyers
20th-century Australian male writers
21st-century Australian male writers